Kinara is a 1977 Indian Hindi-language romantic drama film, produced and directed by Gulzar under the Meghana Movies banner. It stars Jeetendra, Hema Malini and Dharmendra in a special appearance with music composed by R. D. Burman.  A major portion of the film was shot in Mandu, an ancient fort city in Madhya Pradesh.

Plot 
Inder (Jeetendra) is a well-off person working along with his uncle (Shreeram Lagoo) as an architect. His uncle is a fan of famous dancer Aarti Sanyal (Hema Malini). Whilst playing snooker against his uncle,  Inder loses the game and his uncle asks him to join him at Aarti Sanyal's concert. On the way to the concert, Inder meets with a near-fatal accident.

One day his uncle suggests to him to go to Mandu to see the architectural beauty there. He meets a woman there and learns soon that she is the famous dancer Aarti Sanyal. She tells him that she has quit dancing for 6 months and her grandfather tells him that it is because of an incident that shook her life. Soon, they become more friendly and she ends up telling him about her love Chandan (Dharmendra) who calls her Tikoo with love. Her only dream is to publish a historical book written by Chandan. She tells him that 6 months ago, Chandan died in a car accident on the way to her concert.  Inder is surprised by this revelation and asks her where the accident exactly took place. He realizes that it was his accident in which the person in the oncoming vehicle died. Extremely upset, he calls up his uncle and asks him why this was withheld from him. As his stay in Mandu continues, Aarti cries remembering her past. Inder cannot hold it further and tells her that he was in the accident in which her lover Chandan had died. She becomes extremely upset. She tries to snatch Chandan's book from his hand saying that she needs no sympathy from him. In the confusion of trying to take the book, she falls down the stairs and sustains injuries. He tries to meet her, but her grandfather tells him that she hates to even hear his name and they leave in the wee hours of the morning.

He goes back to his home where his uncle advises him to leave her alone if only because of sympathy for her. But if he has fallen in love with her, then he should try to win her. Inder explains to his uncle that he went to her grandfather's house (the address given in the hotel register at Mandu), but no one was there. His uncle asks his secretary to call up clinics to find out if any lady has come for treatment. They finally find the clinic where Aarti is. Inder goes there where she has undergone eye surgery. The doctor removes the eye bandage but Aarti loses her eyesight. Inder talks to her mother and she asks her mother if it is Inder. The doctor lies and tells her that it is his friend Prakash.

Inder as Prakash goes regularly to her home and supports her. He takes her out to church to pray and also helps her get back to her dancing skills.  He arranges for her show to be performed where he supports her during her dance. She uses the money which she earned from the concert to try to publish Chandan's book. She gives the book to a publisher, finding it empty, the publisher tells her that the book she has given him is empty. She goes home where Inder comes and tells her that he has brought a surprise to her. She asks him whether it is Chandan's book as only Inder knew about Chandan's death anniversary and Prakash wouldn't know about it. She tells him that he snatched everything from her. Chandan, her eyesight and her only dream of publishing Chandan's book. She tells him to leave. As days go by, Aarti realizes she is still stuck in her past. She goes to the same church with her grandfather where she meets Inder again. She asks for his forgiveness and explains to him that she always tried to live in her past. She tells him that she never realized how much Inder has been an important part of her life. Both Inder and Aarti unite.

Cast 
Jeetendra as Inder
Hema Malini as Aarti
Dharmendra as Chandan Arya (Special Appearance)
Shreeram Lagoo as Architect
Om Shivpuri as Aarti's Grandfather
Dina Pathak as Aarti's Mother

Soundtrack 
The evergreen songs of this album were composed by R. D. Burman.

Box office 
Kinara was well received by the masses as well as the critics.

Awards 

 25th Filmfare Awards:

Nominated

 Best Director – Gulzar
 Best Actress – Hema Malini
 Best Supporting Actor – Shriram Lagoo
 Best Music Director – R. D. Burman
 Best Lyricist – Gulzar for "Naam Gum Jaayega"
 Best Story – Bhusan Bangali

References

External links 

1977 films
1970s Hindi-language films
Films shot in Madhya Pradesh
Films scored by R. D. Burman
Films directed by Gulzar
Films produced by Gulzar